Barbara Schulthess (1745 - 1818), was a Swiss Salonnière. From 1772 onward, she hosted a literary salon in Zürich, which came to be regarded as the intellectual center of contemporary Zürich. She is known as the friend and correspondent of Johann Wolfgang von Goethe.

She was the daughter of a silk trader and married the silk trader Hauptmann David Schulthess (d. 1778) in 1763.

References 
 Bernhard Suphan: Goethe und Barbara Schulthess. Rütten & Loening, Frankfurt 1892

1745 births
1818 deaths
18th-century Swiss people
19th-century Swiss people
18th-century Swiss women
19th-century Swiss women
Swiss salon-holders
18th-century Swiss women writers
19th-century Swiss women writers
18th-century Swiss writers
19th-century Swiss writers